Thirteen Days is a 2000 American historical political thriller film directed by Roger Donaldson. It dramatizes the Cuban Missile Crisis of 1962, seen from the perspective of the US political leadership. Kevin Costner stars as top White House assistant Kenneth P. O'Donnell, with Bruce Greenwood featured as President John F. Kennedy, Steven Culp as Attorney General Robert F. Kennedy, and Dylan Baker as Secretary of Defense Robert McNamara.

While the film carries the same title as the 1969 book Thirteen Days by former Attorney General Robert F. Kennedy, it is in fact based on the 1997 book, The Kennedy Tapes: Inside the White House During the Cuban Missile Crisis, by Ernest R. May and Philip D. Zelikow. It is the second docudrama made about the crisis, the first being 1974's The Missiles of October, which was based on Kennedy's book. The 2000 film contains some newly declassified information not available to the earlier production, but takes greater dramatic license, particularly in its choice of O'Donnell as protagonist. It received generally positive reviews from critics who praised the screenplay and performances of the cast but was a box office bomb grossing $66.6 million against its $80 million budget.

Plot
In October 1962, U-2 aerial surveillance photos reveal that the Soviet Union is in the process of placing intermediate-range ballistic missiles carrying nuclear weapons in Cuba. President John F. Kennedy and his advisers must come up with a plan of action to prevent their activation. Kennedy is determined to show that the United States will not allow a missile threat. The Joint Chiefs of Staff advise immediate U.S. military strikes against the missile sites followed by an invasion of Cuba. Kennedy is reluctant to attack and invade because it would very likely cause the Soviets to invade Berlin, which could lead to an all-out war. Citing The Guns of August, Kennedy sees an analogy to the events that started World War I, where the tactics of both sides' commanders had not evolved since the previous war and were obsolete, only this time nuclear weapons are involved. War appears to be almost inevitable.

The Kennedy administration tries to find a solution that will remove the missiles but avoid an act of war. They reject a blockade, as this is formally regarded as an act of war, and settle on what they publicly describe as a quarantine. They announce that the U.S. naval forces will stop all ships entering Cuban waters and inspect them to verify they are not carrying weapons destined for Cuba. The Soviet Union sends mixed messages in response. Off the shores of Cuba, the Soviet ships turn back from the quarantine lines. Secretary of State Dean Rusk says, "We're eyeball to eyeball and I think the other fellow just blinked." The administration continues to order spy plane pictures, but one of Kennedy's top advisers, Kenneth O'Donnell, calls the pilots to ensure the pilots do not report that they were shot at or fired upon, because if they were, the country would be forced to retaliate under the rules of engagement.

John A. Scali, a reporter with ABC News, is contacted by Soviet "emissary" Aleksandr Fomin, and through this back-channel communication method the Soviets offer to remove the missiles in exchange for public assurances from the U.S. that it will never invade Cuba. A long message in the same tone as the informal communication from Fomin, apparently written personally by Soviet Premier Nikita Khrushchev, is received. This is followed by a second, more hard line cable in which the Soviets offer a deal involving U.S removal of its Jupiter missiles from Turkey. The Kennedy administration interprets the second as a response from the Politburo, and in a risky act, decides to ignore it and respond to the first message, assumed to be from Khrushchev. There are several mis-steps during the crisis: the defense readiness level of Strategic Air Command (SAC) is raised to DEFCON 2 (one step shy of maximum readiness for imminent war), without informing the President; a nuclear weapon test proceeds (Bluegill Triple Prime) and a routine test launch of a U.S. offensive missile is also carried out without the President's knowledge.

In a bid for time while under intense pressure from the military for an immediate strike, President Kennedy authorizes attacks on the missile sites and an invasion of Cuba, to commence the following Monday. An Air Force U-2 reconnaissance plane is sent over Cuba to gather intelligence for the attack, but is shot down, killing the pilot. After much deliberation with the Executive Committee of the National Security Council, Kennedy makes a final attempt to avoid a war by sending his brother, Robert F. Kennedy to meet with Soviet ambassador Anatoly Dobrynin on Friday night. Bobby reiterates the demand that the Soviets remove their missiles from Cuba, and in return promises not to invade or assist in the invasion of Cuba. Dobrynin insists that the U.S. must also remove all Jupiter missiles from Turkey, on the border of the Soviet Union. Bobby says that a quid pro quo is not possible, but in exchange for Khrushchev removing all the missiles from Cuba, there will be a secret understanding that the U.S. will remove all of its "obsolete" missiles from Turkey within six months as part of a pre-scheduled plan. The Soviets announce on Sunday that they will remove their missiles from Cuba, averting a war that could have escalated to the use of nuclear weapons. The film ends with President Kennedy dictating a letter of condolence to the family of the reconnaissance pilot, Rudolf Anderson, who was shot down over Cuba as part of the preparations for the invasion, and the Kennedy brothers and O'Donnell outside of the Oval Office as actual audio of President Kennedy's commencement speech at American University played in the background.

Cast

 Bruce Greenwood as President John F. Kennedy
 Steven Culp as Attorney General Robert F. Kennedy
 Stephanie Romanov as First Lady Jacqueline Kennedy
 Kevin Costner as Special Assistant to the President Kenneth O'Donnell
 Dylan Baker as Secretary of Defense Robert McNamara
 Michael Fairman as United States Ambassador to the United Nations Adlai Stevenson II
 Daniel Vergara as Secretary General of the Organization of American States José Antonio Mora
 Bill Smitrovich as Chairman of the Joint Chiefs of Staff General Maxwell Taylor, USA
 Jack Blessing as ABC News correspondent John A. Scali
 Frank Wood as National Security Advisor McGeorge Bundy
 Ed Lauter as Deputy Director of the CIA Lieutenant General Marshall Carter, USA 
 Madison Mason as Chief of Naval Operations Admiral George Whelan Anderson Jr.
 Kevin Conway as Chief of Staff of the USAF General Curtis LeMay, USAF
 Pramod Kumar as United Nations Secretary General U Thant
 Tim Kelleher as White House Counsel   Ted Sorensen
 Len Cariou as Former Secretary of State Dean Acheson
 Charles Esten as U-2 pilot Major Rudolf Anderson, USAF
 Olek Krupa as Soviet Foreign Minister Andrei Gromyko
 Lucinda Jenney as Helen O'Donnell, wife to Kenneth O'Donnell
 Jack McGee as Richard J. Daley, Mayor of Chicago
 Janet Coleman as Evelyn Lincoln, President Kennedy's Secretary
 Tom Everett as Walter Sheridan, Special assistant to President Kennedy
 Oleg Vidov as Valerian Zorin, Soviet Ambassador to the United Nations.
 John Aylward as Orvil Dryfoos,  publisher of The New York Times
 Elya Baskin as Anatoly Dobrynin, Ambassador of the Soviet Union to the United States
 Larry Strauss as Treasury Secretary C. Douglas Dillon   
 Alex Veadov as Radio Room Operator #3
 Henry Strozier as Secretary of State Dean Rusk
 Walter Adrian as Vice President Lyndon B. Johnson
 Christopher Lawford as RF-8 Crusader pilot, Commander William Ecker, USN.  
 Lawford, son of Peter Lawford and Patricia Kennedy Lawford, is nephew to President Kennedy and Robert Kennedy
 Kelly Connell as Press Secretary Pierre Salinger
 Peter White as Director of the  Central Intelligence Agency John McCone
 Boris Lee Krutonog as Alexander Feklisov (a.k.a. Alexander Fomin), KGB spy
 Dakin Matthews as Arthur C. Lundahl
 James Karen as George Ball
 Dan Ziskie as General Commander of the  Tactical Air Command Walter 'Cam' Sweeney  (USAF)
 Caitlin Wachs as Kathy O'Donnell
 Jon Foster as Kenny O'Donnell, Jr.
 Marya Kazakova as Soviet Woman

Production
The film was co-produced by several studios, including New Line Cinema, Costner's Tig Productions and Armyan Bernstein's Beacon Pictures.

The Department of Defense co-operated to some extent by allowing the producers to film on several bases. To keep the film "in period," filming took place on ships from the time of the crisis that still existed in the active fleet and ships that are preserved as museums. Aircraft (both a preserved F-8 Crusader and Lockheed U-2 spyplane were featured) that still exist from the period were refurbished to appear operational as well. The RF-8 Crusader (and an F-5) and the scenes of Cuba were shot in the Philippines. The air base scene was taken at Clark Air Base, Philippines, a former American facility, which substituted for NAS Key West, Florida, where the actual RF-8As of Light Photographic Squadron SIX TWO (VFP-62) launched from on their Cuban overflight missions. At the time of the shooting, the F-8 was still in the inventory of the Philippine Air Force but was no longer operational. The F-5 was retired in 2005.

Reception

Box office
The film was given a limited theatrical release on Christmas Day 2000, and a wide release on January 12, 2001, with a staggered release to various countries throughout most of the year. The film grossed $66,579,890 worldwide against a production budget of $80 million.

Critical response
Rotten Tomatoes reports that 83% of 124 critics have given the film positive reviews, with an average rating of 7.2/10. The website's consensus states: "Thirteen Days offers a compelling look at the Cuban Missile Crisis, and its talented cast deftly portrays the real-life people who were involved." Metacritic, which assigns a rating out of 100 to reviews from mainstream film critics, gives Thirteen Days a score of 67, based on 31 reviews, indicating "generally favorable reviews". Audiences surveyed by CinemaScore gave the film an average grade of "A-" on an A+ to F scale.

Roger Ebert of the Chicago Sun-Times gave Thirteen Days a rating of 3 stars out of 4, and said "The movie's taut, flat style is appropriate for a story that is more about facts and speculation than about action. Kennedy and his advisers study high-altitude photos and intelligence reports, and wonder if Khrushchev's word can be trusted. Everything depends on what they decide. The movie shows men in unknotted ties and shirt-sleeves, grasping coffee cups or whiskey glasses and trying to sound rational while they are at some level terrified...[T]hings might not have happened exactly like this, but it sure did feel like they did."

Political response
Some former Kennedy administration officials and contemporary historians, including Arthur Schlesinger Jr., Special Counsel Ted Sorensen, and Secretary of Defense Robert McNamara, criticized the film for the depiction of Special Assistant Kenneth O'Donnell as chief motivator of Kennedy and others during the crisis. Prior to seeing the movie, McNamara reacted to the premise in a PBS NewsHour interview:

For God's sakes, Kenny O'Donnell didn't have any role whatsoever in the missile crisis; he was a political appointment secretary to the President; that's absurd.

According to McNamara, the duties performed by O'Donnell in the film were closer to the role Sorensen played during the actual crisis: "It was not Kenny O'Donnell who pulled us all together—it was Ted Sorensen." After seeing the movie McNamara remarked that while he still thought the filmmakers took some creative liberties with certain characters, he ultimately thought that it was a reasonable historical portrayal of the crisis:

I think it's an absolutely fascinating portrayal and a very constructive and responsible portrayal of a very, very serious crisis not only in the history of this nation but in the history of the world.

Kenny O'Donnell's son, the venture capitalist Kevin O'Donnell, bought back controlling interest in the production company Beacon Pictures in 1999 along side earlier founder Armyan Bernstein. Kevin and Beacon Pictures have denied any undue influence on the screenplay portrayals of the released Thirteen Days the next year.  

Costner traveled to Cuba in 2001 to screen the film for Fidel Castro, saying at a press conference, "It was an experience of a lifetime to sit only a few feet away from him and watch him relive an experience he lived as a very young man."

Home media
The DVD & VHS was released on July 10, 2001. The DVD release marked the debut for New Line's Infinifilm label.

See also
 Cultural depictions of John F. Kennedy
 Vought F-8 Crusader

References

External links

 
 Thirteen Days in 145 minutes – commentary by Ernest R. May, Harvard professor who wrote the book on which it was based, on the accuracy of the movie
 White House Museum - How accurate was the movie recreation of the architecture and floor plan of the actual White House (review)
  "The 34 best political movies ever made", Ann Hornaday, The Washington Post Jan. 23, 2020), ranked #18

Cold War films
2000 films
2000s English-language films
2000s Russian-language films
Romanian-language films
2000 drama films
Films about the Cuban Missile Crisis
Films about presidents of the United States
Drama films based on actual events
American docudrama films
Films based on non-fiction books
Films directed by Roger Donaldson
Films set in the 1960s
Films set in 1962
Films set in Connecticut
Films set in Cuba
Films set in Florida
Films set in Washington, D.C.
Films shot in Washington, D.C.
American political thriller films
Films about nuclear war and weapons
Films about John F. Kennedy
Films about Robert F. Kennedy
Cultural depictions of John F. Kennedy
Cultural depictions of Robert F. Kennedy
Cultural depictions of Lyndon B. Johnson
Cultural depictions of Jacqueline Kennedy Onassis
New Line Cinema films
Films distributed by Disney
Hollywood Pictures films
Beacon Pictures films
Films produced by Armyan Bernstein
Films shot in the Philippines
Films scored by Trevor Jones
American political drama films
2000s American films